was a professional Japanese baseball player, coach, and manager.

External links

1949 births
2015 deaths
Japanese baseball players
Nippon Professional Baseball infielders
Hanshin Tigers players
Managers of baseball teams in Japan
Hanshin Tigers managers
Orix Buffaloes managers
Baseball people from Chiba Prefecture
FAO Goodwill ambassadors